Ong Su Mann is a writer, producer, and columnist based in Singapore, often writing as S. M. Ong. He is best known as a producer and writer for the popular comedy show Phua Chu Kang Pte Ltd (1997–2007), and he was the writer of Phua Chu Kang The Movie (2010). He is currently a columnist for The New Paper of Singapore, writing the column "Act Blur". He wrote and directed the "Daddy's Girls" episode that won the Asian Television Award for Best Comedy in 2005.

References

Living people
People from Singapore
Singaporean writers
Singaporean people of Chinese descent
Year of birth missing (living people)